Buksh or Bukhsh is a Muslim surname or male given name, derived from the Persian word bakhsh, meaning "fate", "destiny" or "share". An alternative spelling is Bux. The name may refer to:

Allah Bukhsh Karim Bukhsh Brohi (1915–1987), Pakistani politician
Anisur Khuda-Bukhsh (born 1948), Indian zoologist
Khuda Buksh (1912–1974), Indian businessman
M. S. Buksh (died 1967), Fijian politician
Malik Khuda Buksh Tiwana, Pakistani politician
Mirza Namrud Buksh (1925–2007), Fijian politician

See also
Bux (surname)

References

Iranian masculine given names
Pakistani names
Urdu-language surnames